"Not a Bad Thing" is a song recorded by American singer-songwriter Justin Timberlake for his fourth studio album, The 20/20 Experience – 2 of 2 (2013). It was written and produced by Timberlake, Timothy "Timbaland" Mosley, and Jerome "J-Roc" Harmon, with additional writing from James Fauntleroy. It was released as the third single from the album on February 24, 2014. The song is a mid-tempo pop ballad, that makes use of an acoustic guitar throughout, with its lyrics centering on the semantic field of love.

"Not a Bad Thing" received positive reviews from several contemporary music critics. The song's music video premiered on The Ellen DeGeneres Show on March 20, 2014. It is a mini documentary, that follows two documentary filmmakers searching for a couple that got engaged on January 12, 2014, while heading to New York City on the Long Island Rail Road train, with the man proposing to his girlfriend to "Not a Bad Thing". The video concludes with the filmmakers being led to several false leads, with a second part of the video to follow. Timberlake performed the song on The Tonight Show Starring Jimmy Fallon and during The 20/20 Experience World Tour. The song reached number 8 on the US Billboard Hot 100 and topped the Mainstream Top 40.

Production and release 

"Not a Bad Thing" was written by Timberlake, Timothy "Timbaland" Mosley, Jerome "J-Roc" Harmon, James Fauntleroy and debut by Joey Giltner. When looking for a new love song, Timberlake received song and from a new writer this song was received and decided to record. The song was produced by Timbaland, Timberlake, and Harmon. Timberlake arranged and produced his vocals, which were recorded at Larabee Studios in North Hollywood, California. Harmon provided keyboards for the song, while Elliot Ives and Timberlake played the guitar. The track was engineered by Chris Godbey, and mixed by Jimmy Douglass, Godbey and Timberlake, with assistance from Alejandro Baima, at Larabee Studios.

RCA executives reportedly believed that "Not a Bad Thing" could be The 20/20 Experience – 2 of 2s largest commercial success. However, they instead opted to release "Take Back the Night" and "TKO" first, to represent the album's R&B sound and distinguish "Not a Bad Thing" from the sonically similar "Mirrors". A radio edit of the song was digitally released on February 24, 2014 in Austria, France, Germany, Italy, Spain, Switzerland, the United Kingdom and the United States. The next day, it impacted the contemporary hit radio in the United States. On March 31 was sent to US adult contemporary radio and on May 27 to its UK equivalent. "Not a Bad Thing" was released as a CD single in Austria, Germany and Switzerland; apart of the radio edit of the song it also featured the "TKO (Black Friday Remix)". "Not a Bad Thing" impacted the mainstream radio in Italy on June 4.

Composition and lyrical interpretation 
"Not a Bad Thing" is a mid-tempo pop ballad, with a running duration of 11 minutes and 28 seconds; the album version has an included hidden track entitled "Pair of Wings". Critics noted the song's resemblance to songs by former boy band NSYNC, which Timberlake had previously been a member of. and the song's focus on the theme of love. PopMatters''' Brice Ezell saw "Not a Bad Thing" to share the same characteristics as NSYNC's 1999 "(God Must Have Spent) A Little More Time on You", using the same "emotional earnestness" which made the latter song the "heart-melter" it was during its release. Mikael Wood of Los Angeles Times described the song as a "dewy, blue-eyed soul number" that was realized when Timberlake was discovering the "emotional possibilities of his singing" during his time with the boy band. Holly Gleason of Paste interpreted the lyrics as endorsing love, with the song contrasting the previous tracks on The 20/20 Experience – 2 of 2, celebrating the "happily ever after trope for all its worth".

 Critical response 
"Not a Bad Thing" received general acclaim from critics. Jeremy Thomas of 411mania.com selected "Not a Bad Thing" as one of the stand-out tracks from The 20/20 Experience – 2 of 2, using it as an example of a song from the album that "has a gentle side that can be appreciated," noting it as a "lovely close" to the album. Similarly selecting the track as a stand-out, Chris Bosman of Consequence of Sound saw the song serving as the "pitch perfect" nostalgic track, pointing out its 'NSYNC influence. As well as depicting the latter influence, Melinda Newman of HitFix awarded the track an A grade, labeling it as a "lovely, lilting straight-up pop tune." David Meller of musicOMH described the track as "arduous" due to its length and it having "any sort of edginess or intrigue." Along with several other songs within The 20/20 Experience – 2 of 2, Dave Hanratty of Drowned in Sound dismissed "Not a Bad Thing", writing that it contains "sun-kissed and forced smiles."

 Commercial performance 
"Not a Bad Thing" reached the top 30 on the US Billboard Hot 100 in its fourth week on the chart, at number 27. In its fifth week it rose to number 20, and in its sixth week, it again rose to number 14. The song reached number 12 in its seventh week, before entering the top 10 at number 8 the following week. The song sold 88,000 digital copies that week, with an audience impression of 79 million. It marked his 15th top ten hit on the Hot 100, while being the first and only top 10 single from The 20/20 Experience – 2 of 2. "Not a Bad Thing" has also achieved similar success on the US format charts, peaking at number 1 on the Mainstream Top 40, number 1 on the Adult Top 40 and at number 4 on the Rhythmic chart. On the Mainstream Top 40, Timberlake became the male artist with the most number-one songs and top 10 singles. Bruno Mars later tied with Timberlake for the most number-one singles among men when his Mark Ronson's collaboration "Uptown Funk" reached the top spot in early 2015. The tie was broken by Timberlake's "Can't Stop the Feeling!" in June 2016.

In 2014, "Not a Bad Thing" was ranked as the 45th most popular song of the year on the Billboard Hot 100.

As of 2018, the song has sold 1.5 million downloads in the United States.

 Music video 
A preview of the song's music video made its debut on The Ellen DeGeneres Show on March 20, 2014, before the full video premiered online later that day. Justin Timberlake does not make an appearance in the video; the video involves two documentary filmmakers searching for a couple that got engaged on January 12, 2014, while heading to New York City on the Long Island Rail Road, with the man proposing to his girlfriend to "Not a Bad Thing". Throughout the music video, couples are interviewed, sharing their reflections on love, marriage and their relationships, as well as what they think of the unknown couple. In conjunction, the documentarians are shown in the streets of New York City with flyers with the hashtag "#haveyouseenthiscouple," as well as them stopping by a radio interview and texting each other from borough to borough, with the messages showing up on the screen. The search produces several false leads, as they ask strangers and friends for help, with the video ending with a "To Be Continued" title. Following the video's premiere, Ellen DeGeneres explained that "Obviously, if you know this couple, contact us, because Justin is trying to find you and we'll put you all together."

A second video documenting several love stories that fans submitted on Twitter under the hashtag #NotABadLoveStory collecting photos and videos was shared on Timberlake's Vevo channel on YouTube.

 Live performances 

Justin Timberlake performed "Not a Bad Thing" on The Tonight Show Starring Jimmy Fallon on February 21, 2014. Timberlake also performed the song during The 20/20 Experience and 2 of 2 supporting tour, The 20/20 Experience World Tour.

 Track listings 

CD single
"Not a Bad Thing" (Radio Edit) — 4:26
"TKO" (Black Friday Remix) featuring J. Cole, ASAP Rocky and Pusha T — 4:32

Digital download
"Not a Bad Thing" — 4:26

 Credits and personnel 

Credits adapted from the liner notes of The 20/20 Experience – 2 of 2''.
Locations
Vocals recorded and mixed at Larrabee Studios, North Hollywood, California
Personnel

Timothy "Timbaland" Mosley – producer, songwriter
Justin Timberlake – Mixer, producer, songwriter, vocal producer, vocal arranger, guitar
Jerome "J-Roc" Harmon – keyboards, producer, songwriter
James Fauntleroy – songwriter
Chris Godbey – engineer, mixer
Jimmy Douglass – mixer
Alejandro Baima – assistant mixer
Elliot Ives – guitar

Charts

Weekly charts

Monthly charts

Year-end charts

Certifications

Release history

See also 
 List of Billboard Hot 100 top 10 singles in 2014
 List of Mainstream Top 40 number-one hits of 2014 (U.S.)

References

External links 

2013 songs
2014 singles
Justin Timberlake songs
Song recordings produced by Jerome "J-Roc" Harmon
Song recordings produced by Justin Timberlake
Song recordings produced by Timbaland
Songs written by James Fauntleroy
Songs written by Jerome "J-Roc" Harmon
Songs written by Justin Timberlake
Songs written by Timbaland
RCA Records singles
Pop ballads
2010s ballads